Tron: Legacy (Original Motion Picture Soundtrack) is the soundtrack album to the 2010 film of the same name, released by Walt Disney Records on December 3, 2010. It is the only film score by French music duo Daft Punk.

Background
Tron: Legacy director Joseph Kosinski and music supervisor Jason Bentley approached Daft Punk and requested that the duo compose the film score. When asked why he wished to work with the duo, Kosinski replied, "How could you not at least go to those guys?" The film producers initially attempted to reach Daft Punk in 2007, but the duo had been unavailable due to their Alive 2006/2007 tour. Thomas Bangalter of Daft Punk had previously produced the soundtrack to Gaspar Noé's 2002 film Irréversible. Noé had asked Bangalter to compose the soundtrack to the film Enter the Void, but Bangalter was working on Tron: Legacy at the time and instead served as sound effects director.

The score of Tron: Legacy features an 85-piece orchestra, recorded at AIR Lyndhurst Studios in London. Kosinski stated that the score is intended to be a mixture of orchestral and electronic music.  Daft Punk's score was arranged and orchestrated by Joseph Trapanese, who stated he is a fan of Daft Punk as a duo and as solo artists. The band collaborated with him for two years on the score, from pre-production to completion. The orchestra was conducted by Gavin Greenaway. Trapanese cited the collaboration between the different genres to work out well in the end, stating: It seems complicated at the end of the day, but it’s actually quite simple. I was locked in a room with robots for almost two years and it was simply a lot of hard work. We were just together working throughout the whole process and there was never a point where the orchestra was not in their minds and the electronics were not in my mind. It was a continual translation between the two worlds and hopefully we put something together that will be something different because of that.

Commenting on the Tron: Legacy score, Guy-Manuel de Homem-Christo commented that "We knew from the start that there was no way we were going to do this film score with two synthesizers and a drum machine." Daft Punk cited Wendy Carlos, the composer of the original Tron film, as inspiration for the soundtrack as well as Max Steiner, Bernard Herrmann, John Carpenter, Vangelis and Maurice Jarre. De Homem-Christo also stated that Tron was a strong influence on him as a child. "Maybe I only saw it two or three times in my entire life, but the feel of it is strong even now, that I think the imprint of the first [film] will not be erased by the new one. It has a real visionary quality to it." Bangalter recalled that he had composed heroic themes for the protagonists, while de Homem-Christo had written the darker musical cues. De Homem-Christo concluded that Tron: Legacy "was cut to the music. Usually, composers come in at the end when everything is done."

The song "Computerized" featuring Jay-Z surfaced online years after the film was released. It tells a cautionary tale about relying too much on technology, with robotic voice singing "Everyone will be computerized" in the chorus. Jay-Z takes on the role of a Luddite in the lyrics, complaining about holding conversations over text messages and having a "broken heart on the email" and "an iTouch but I can't feel". Later, he raps: "Somebody tell me what's real / I don't know how I feel." "Computerized" was originally intended to be a single to appear in and promote Tron: Legacy, but was discarded after concerns of the lyrical content being too grounded to fit the film. The instrumental was instead used in the film score.

Promotion

The first theatrical trailer for Tron: Legacy featured the track "The Game Has Changed". A "special presentation" trailer featuring Daft Punk and their track "Derezzed" was released online on October 26, 2010. The official music video for "Derezzed" was released online on December 7, 2010. The video features Daft Punk playing an old arcade game in Flynn's Arcade, and an appearance by Tron: Legacy cast member Olivia Wilde. The video was later included as a bonus feature on the DVD and Blu-ray releases of Tron: Legacy.

A deluxe edition of the album was made available from the official Tron: Legacy soundtrack website that includes a poster of Daft Punk as they appear in the film. In regions outside the United States, a two-disc special edition was made available for a limited time. As a pre-order bonus for the album on the iTunes Store, "Derezzed" was released as a single on December 8, 2010. The iTunes release of the album includes two bonus tracks: "Father and Son" and "Outlands, Pt. II". The Amazon MP3 version of the album includes the bonus track "Sea of Simulation". The Ovi release of the album includes the bonus track "Sunrise Prelude". The songs "Separate Ways (Worlds Apart)" by Journey and "Sweet Dreams (Are Made of This)" by Eurythmics are featured in the film, but absent from the soundtrack album.

"End of Line" was released as the album's the first promotional single in September 2010. The second promotional single "The Game Has Changed"  was released on November 9, 2010.

Critical reception

At Metacritic, which assigns a normalized rating out of 100 to reviews from mainstream critics, the Tron: Legacy soundtrack received an average score of 71, based on 27 reviews, indicating "generally favorable reviews". A review in AllMusic commented on the blend of electronic and orchestral music, specifically noting that in "The Son of Flynn" the "arpeggios and strings are so tightly knit that they finish each others' phrases". The A.V. Club observed the "synergistic dream" of Daft Punk's robotic personae with the film's science fiction aesthetic, further stating that the album "is neither groundbreaking experiment nor crucial entry in the duo's catalog, but it’s an adeptly realized, tonally complementary companion" to the film. Similarly, a Clash review remarked: "As a stand-alone album, what Guy-Manuel de Homem-Christo and Thomas Bangalter have created won't sate the disco heads screaming for more club material, however as an accomplished score it can only make a legendary film yet more cherished.

Pitchfork Media expressed that the Tron: Legacy soundtrack is the continuation of Daft Punk's growing interest in complementing music with visual imagery, noting the duo's previous Alive 2006/2007 tour and feature film Interstella 5555 as examples. A review in Spin also pointed out Daft Punk's history with filmmakers in the duo's earliest music videos and "That Daft Punk's Guy-Manuel de Homem-Christo and Thomas Bangalter would score Tron: Legacy seems destined."

Christian Clemmensen of Filmtracks.com spoke highly of the score, awarding the music 4 out of 5 stars calling it "a success of a score", but panned its treatment on the various commercial releases stating, "There have been many disgraceful releases of soundtracks over the previous ten years, but the situation with Tron: Legacy not only establishes a new low in terms of the division of the score onto differing products, but also makes no sense for the market in 2010. In order for a fan of this score to acquire all of the commercially available music for Tron: Legacy (amounting to almost 80 minutes), he or she will be forced, at least initially, to purchase three of four separate products. Forget the fact that 79 minutes of this score would have fit nicely onto one CD."

The soundtrack debuted at number 10 on the Billboard 200 albums chart with sales of 71,000 copies. This marked the duo's first top 10 album/soundtrack in the United States. In its second week, the soundtrack dropped to number 33 on the Billboard 200. It managed to sell an additional 67,000 copies in its third week of release, coming in at number 27 on the Billboard 200. In its fourth week, the soundtrack rose to a new peak position of number 6 on the Billboard 200 selling an additional 54,000 copies. In its fifth week, the album reached a new peak of number 4 by selling 34,000 copies. As of November 17, 2011, Tron: Legacy was awarded with a gold certification for 500,000 units sold.  It has sold 588,000 copies as of May 2013.

Tron: Legacy received an award for "Best Original Score" from the Austin Film Critics Association, and was nominated for Score of the Year and Breakout Composer of the Year, and won Best Original Score for a Fantasy/Science Fiction/Horror Film by the International Film Music Critics Association. The soundtrack album was nominated for Best Score Soundtrack Album for Visual Media at the 54th Grammy Awards.

Use in media 

 "Recognizer" was used in the teaser trailer for the film Resident Evil: Retribution. 
 "The Game Has Changed" was used in the trailer for the television series Game of Thrones.
 A portion of "The Game Has Changed" was used during the opening ceremony for the 2014 Winter Olympics in Sochi, Russia.
 "Outlands" is used as the Sky Sports F1 title music replacing Alistair Griffin's "Just Drive" for the 2019 season onwards.
 Part of the speech from "The Grid" was sampled in the song "Haunting" by drum and bass producer Andy C.

Track listing

Personnel
Adapted from the Tron: Legacy soundtrack liner notes.

 Daft Punk – producer
 Mitchell Leib – producer
 Joseph Kosinski – executive producer
 Sean Bailey – executive producer
 Jason Bentley – music supervisor

Charts

Weekly charts

Year-end charts

Certifications

Remix album

Walt Disney Records released a remix album of the score titled Tron: Legacy Reconfigured on April 5, 2011. The album features remixes of selections of the film score by various artists.

References

External links

Walt Disney Records entry
Tron: Legacy (soundtrack) at Metacritic

Soundtrack
2010 soundtrack albums
Albums produced by Thomas Bangalter
Albums produced by Guy-Manuel de Homem-Christo
Daft Punk soundtracks
Disney film soundtracks
Film scores
Science fiction soundtracks
Walt Disney Records soundtracks